Marcelo Fabián Sosa Farías (born 2 June 1978) is an Uruguayan retired footballer who played as a defensive midfielder.

His nickname is "Pato" – Spanish for duck – and he played professionally for clubs in five countries.

Club career
Born in Montevideo, Sosa started his career at Danubio FC, being a mainstay for several seasons. In January 2004 he joined FC Spartak Moscow on a four-year deal, but only six months later he moved to Atlético Madrid in Spain on a free transfer, signing a three-year link with the La Liga club.

Although he appeared in 28 league games during the campaign, Sosa failed to impress, being loaned to fellow league side CA Osasuna where he was used rarely during the Navarrese's historical season (a fourth place). He added two contests in the UEFA Cup.

After another loan, at Club Atlético River Plate in January 2007, Sosa was allowed to join hometown's Club Nacional de Football on another free transfer, despite still having a six-month contract left with Atlético Madrid. On 7 January 2008, Tecos UAG officially presented him to the Guadalajara-area media.

In the 2009 summer 31-year-old Sosa returned to his country, signing with national powerhouse C.A. Peñarol. In early February 2011 he joined fellow Primera División team Racing Club de Montevideo, on a six-month contract.

International career
Having first appeared for Uruguay in 2003, Sosa represented the nation at the 2004 Copa América, playing in all the matches for a final third-place.

References

External links

National team data 

1978 births
Living people
Footballers from Montevideo
Uruguayan footballers
Association football midfielders
Uruguayan Primera División players
Danubio F.C. players
Club Nacional de Football players
Peñarol players
Racing Club de Montevideo players
Russian Premier League players
FC Spartak Moscow players
La Liga players
Atlético Madrid footballers
CA Osasuna players
Argentine Primera División players
Club Atlético River Plate footballers
Liga MX players
Tecos F.C. footballers
Uruguay international footballers
2004 Copa América players
Uruguayan expatriate footballers
Expatriate footballers in Russia
Expatriate footballers in Spain
Expatriate footballers in Argentina
Expatriate footballers in Mexico
Uruguayan expatriate sportspeople in Spain
Uruguayan expatriate sportspeople in Mexico